is a third-sector railway company in Nagasaki and Saga Prefecture in Japan.

Lines

Principal investors
 Nagasaki Prefecture (13.7%)
 Lucky Taxi (10.2%)
 Tsuji Industry (10.2%)
 Saihi Motor (10.2%)

History
The company was established in December 1987, and took over operation of the former Japanese National Railways (JNR) Matsuura Line on 1 April 1988, becoming the Nishi-Kyushu Line.

See also
 List of railway lines in Japan

References

External links

  

Railway companies of Japan
Railway companies established in 1987
1987 establishments in Japan
Japanese third-sector railway lines